Mireille Soria (born April 22, 1970) is an American film producer, most notable for working at DreamWorks Animation on many of their films.

She produced Spirit: Stallion of the Cimarron, Sinbad: Legend of the Seven Seas, Madagascar and its sequels Madagascar: Escape 2 Africa and Madagascar 3: Europe's Most Wanted, Home, and Captain Underpants: The First Epic Movie.

After DreamWorks saw a series of financially disappointing films, DreamWorks Animation named Soria co-president of feature animation in early 2015. Along with Bonnie Arnold, she was tasked with overseeing the creative development and production of DWA's theatrical releases. However, in December 2016, Soria stepped down from her role as co-president of feature animation at DWA and returned to producing.

In July 2017, Soria was hired by Paramount to be the president of its animation division, Paramount Animation.  She was replaced in that role by Ramsey Naito in September, 2021.

Filmography

References

External links

Living people
American animated film producers
DreamWorks Animation people
Paramount Pictures executives
1970 births